Mrs. Cop is a 2015 South Korean drama series starring Kim Hee-ae, Kim Min-jong, Lee Da-hee, Son Ho-jun, Heo Jung-do and Lee Gi-kwang. It aired on SBS on Mondays and Tuesdays at 21:55 for 18 episodes beginning 3 August 2015.

Plot 
Choi Young-Jin (Kim Hee-ae) is a female detective squad chief. She also raises her daughter Ha-Eun. At work, she deals with brutal crimes with her senior detective Park Jong-Ho (Kim Min-jong) and squad members Min Do-Young (Lee Da-hee), Han Jin-Woo (Son Ho-jun), Jo Jae-Deok (Heo Jung-do) and Lee Se-Won (Lee Gi-kwang).

Cast

Main characters
Kim Hee-ae as Choi Young-jin
Lead detective of the violent crimes unit, a veteran police officer and mother of Ha-eun
Kim Min-jong as Park Jong-ho
Young-jin's longtime partner in the police force, calm and rational
Lee Da-hee as Min Do-young
Graduate of the police academy, has beauty and brains 
Son Ho-jun as Han Jin-woo
A former special forces soldier
Heo Jung-do as Jo Jae-deok
Lee Gi-kwang as Lee Se-won
Most junior member (maknae) of Young-jin's team, a rookie that has never had to worry about anything, a mama's boy

Supporting characters
Shin So-yul as Choi Nam-jin
Young-jin's dependable little sister, studying for the public service exams
Lee Ki-young as Yeom Sang-min
Son Byong-ho as Kang Tae-Yoo
Kim Kap-soo as Park Dong-Il
Jang In-sub as Prosecutor Go	
Jung Soo-young as Jae-deok's wife
Park Sung-geun as Yoon Sung-Geun
Jeon Se-hyun as Kim Min-Young
Lee Jin-kwon as Lee Man-young	
Shin Seung-hwan as Bae Dal-Hwan
Choi Hyo-eun as Kim Na-rae
Shin Rin-ah as Seo Ha-Eun

Ratings
In the table below, the blue numbers represent the lowest ratings and the red numbers represent the highest ratings.

Awards and nominations

References

External links
 

Seoul Broadcasting System television dramas
2015 South Korean television series debuts
Korean-language television shows
Detective television series
2015 South Korean television series endings
South Korean crime television series
South Korean thriller television series